Alessio Chiaverini  (born July 20, 1984 in Firenze, Italy) is an Italian footballer currently free agent.

External links
Profile 

1984 births
Living people
Italian footballers
Association football goalkeepers
FC Vaslui players
Liga I players
Expatriate footballers in Romania
S.S.D. Sanremese Calcio players
U.S. Imperia 1923 players